Ma Hae-young (born August 14, 1970) is a retired South Korean professional baseball infielder who played for 14 seasons in the KBO League.

References

External links
Career statistics and player information from Korea Baseball Organization

Lotte Giants players
Samsung Lions players
Kia Tigers players
LG Twins players
KBO League infielders
South Korean baseball players
Korean Series MVPs
Korea University alumni
Busan High School alumni
Sportspeople from Busan
1970 births
Living people
Jangheung Ma clan